Dichromodes sphaeriata is a moth of the family Geometridae. It is endemic to New Zealand.

References

Oenochrominae
Moths described in 1875
Moths of New Zealand
Endemic fauna of New Zealand
Taxa named by Alois Friedrich Rogenhofer
Taxa named by Rudolf Felder
Endemic moths of New Zealand